Sparganothoides audentiana is a species of moth of the family Tortricidae. It is found in Mexico in the states of Tamaulipas and Nuevo Leon.

The length of the forewings is 11.1–11.7 mm. The ground colour of the forewings is yellowish brown to orange with brown-tipped orange scales. The hindwings are white to pale yellowish grey.

Etymology
The species name refers to the bold markings of the forewings and is derived from audenter (meaning boldness, courage).

References

Moths described in 2009
Sparganothoides